This page deals with the electron affinity as a property of isolated atoms or molecules (i.e. in the gas phase). Solid state electron affinities are not listed here.

Elements 

Electron affinity can be defined in two equivalent ways. First, as the energy that is released by adding an electron to an isolated gaseous atom. The second (reverse) definition is that electron affinity is the energy required to remove an electron from a singly charged gaseous negative ion. The latter can be regarded as the ionization energy of the  –1 ion or the zeroth ionization energy. Either convention can be used.

Negative electron affinities can be used in those cases where electron capture requires energy, i.e. when capture can occur only if the impinging electron has a kinetic energy large enough to excite a resonance of the atom-plus-electron system. Conversely electron removal from the anion formed in this way releases energy, which is carried out by the freed electron as kinetic energy. Negative ions formed in these cases are always unstable. They may have lifetimes of the order of microseconds to milliseconds, and invariably autodetach after some time.

Molecules 

The electron affinities Eea of some molecules are given in the table below, from the lightest to the heaviest. The electron affinities of the radicals OH and SH are the most precisely known of all molecular electron affinities.

Second and third electron affinity

Bibliography 
 .
 .
 Updated values can be found in the NIST chemistry webbook for around three dozen elements and close to 400 compounds.

Specific molecules

References

See also 

Atomic physics
Chemical properties
Chemical element data pages